Cai Lậy is a town of Tien Giang province in the Mekong Delta region of Vietnam. The town was separated from Cai Lậy District in 2013.

References

Districts of Tiền Giang province
County-level towns in Vietnam